This is a list of mayors of Elbasan who have served since the Albanian Declaration of Independence of 1912.

Mayors (1912–present)

See also 
 Politics of Albania

References 

Elbasan